Essential Air Service (EAS) is a U.S. government program enacted to guarantee that small communities in the United States, which had been served by certificated airlines prior to deregulation in 1978, maintained commercial service. Its aim is to maintain a minimal level of scheduled air service to these communities that otherwise would not be profitable.

The United States Department of Transportation (USDOT) subsidizes airlines to serve communities across the country that otherwise would not receive scheduled air service. As of June 1, 2015, 159 communities in the US received EAS subsidies, of which 44 were in Alaska, two in Hawaii, and one in Puerto Rico. The decision as to what degree of subsidized service a community requires is made based on identifying a specific hub for the community and from there determining the number of trips, seats, and type of aircraft that are necessary to serve that hub.

These increases occurred despite numerous Congressional measures to contain program spending. The George W. Bush Administration sought to reduce the cost of the program to $50 million by stricter eligibility criteria and requiring the local governments of the areas served to contribute to the cost. The Heritage Foundation argued in 2014 that rural airports should receive no federal subsidies through the Essential Air Service program; rather, state and local governments that value the air services should support them. The Congressional Research Service has reported in 2018 that since the early 2000s federal subsidies for the EAS have nearly tripled to almost $300 million per year. By March 2021, the subsidies amounted to $339.19 million per year.

Community eligibility criteria

The criteria for 10 or more enplanements can be waived by the Secretary of Transportation, on an annual basis, if a community can demonstrate that it is due to a temporary decline.

Controversy
Critics question the economic and environmental efficiency of the service. According to a 2006 New York Times article on the program, the subsidy per passenger, averaged across the entire program excluding Alaska, is approximately $74, and much higher on some particularly poorly patronized flights where subsidies are as high as $801 per passenger.

The program is politically popular in the cities receiving the subsidized flights, many of which use an airport with scheduled service as a selling point to attract industry to their regions. Several subsidized airports are within an hour's drive from an unsubsidized airport.

Report tables
The following tables list all Essential Air Service communities under the various funding programs. This is based on the most recent reports issued by the U.S. Department of Transportation (DOT), and updated to reflect changes based on DOT orders. Docket and order numbers link to their respective pages on the docket management site, which typically includes the original files in PDF and other formats.  The hubs are designated using the three-letter IATA airport code assigned by the International Air Transport Association.

Alternate Essential Air Service
The Alternate Essential Air Service program grants funds directly to the municipality or airport authority instead of the air carrier. This allows the community to recruit air service that would not otherwise meet EAS guidelines, such as more frequent service with smaller aircraft, less-than-daily service, flights to differing destinations at different times of the year or week, on-demand air taxi service, scheduled or on-demand ground surface transportation, regionalized air service, or even purchasing an aircraft. This alternative program has most often occurred as a public charter arrangement as prescribed by Title 14 of the Code of Federal Regulations, Part 380. The first airport to enter this program was Manistee County Blacker Airport in 2012.

Community Flexibility Pilot Program
Under the Community Flexibility Pilot Program, established in 2003, up to ten communities can receive a grant equal to two years' worth of subsidy in exchange for forgoing their EAS service for ten years. These grants must be used to fund projects that will improve the airport for general aviation. As of 2020, only one community has ever taken advantage of the program:

Subsidized EAS communities

Areas excluding Alaska

Alaska

Communities formerly having subsidized EAS 
The following tables list airports which formerly had Essential Air Service subsidized routes.

Areas excluding Alaska

Alaska

See also 

Public service obligation

References

External links 

US Department of Transportation: Policy - Essential Air Service
US Department of Transportation: Policy - Essential Air Service Reports

 
United States Department of Transportation
Aviation in Alaska
Aviation law